Salvatore J. Romano (born October 12, 1993) is an American former professional baseball pitcher. He played in Major League Baseball (MLB) for the Cincinnati Reds, Milwaukee Brewers, and New York Yankees.

Early life
Romano was born in Syosset, New York, and raised in Southington, Connecticut. He attended Southington High School and played for the school's baseball team. He was the Gatorade State Player of the Year in 2011, his senior year.

Career

Cincinnati Reds
The Cincinnati Reds selected Romano in the 23rd round of the 2011 Major League Baseball draft. He signed with the Reds rather than play college baseball for the University of Tennessee. He had moved to Knoxville, Tennessee, and taken two courses before he signed with the Reds just before the August 17 signing deadline.

After signing, Romano made his professional debut with the Billings Mustangs and he spent the whole season there, going 5–6 with a 5.32 ERA in 15 starts. He spent 2013 with the Dayton Dragons where he compiled a 7–11 record and 4.86 ERA in 15 starts, and he returned there in 2014, going 8–11 with a 4.12 ERA in 28 starts. He spent 2015 with the Daytona Tortugas and Pensacola Blue Wahoos, compiling a combined 6–9 record and 4.82 ERA in 26 games (25 starts). After the season, the Reds added him to their 40-man roster. In 2016, Romano returned to Pensacola where he pitched to a 6–11 record with a 3.52 ERA and 1.22 WHIP in 27 starts.

Romano began the 2017 season with the Louisville Bats. He was recalled to the Reds on April 16 and he made his major league debut that same day. Romano was sent back down to Louisville two days later. He was recalled from Louisville multiple times during the season before being recalled for the last time on July 18. In ten starts for Louisville he was 1–4 with a 3.47 ERA, and in 16 starts for Cincinnati, he compiled a 5–8 record and 4.45 ERA.

Romano began 2018 as a member of Cincinnati's starting rotation. He ended the season with a record of 8–11 and a 5.31 ERA in 39 games (25 starts). Romano began 2019 as a relief pitcher with Louisville. On July 22, Romano was recalled back to Cincinnati. The next day, Romano would pitch three innings while giving up only three hits and one earned run and recorded two strikeouts en route to recording a save in a win over the Milwaukee Brewers.

Romano was designated for assignment by the Reds on February 5, 2020. On September 13, 2020, Romano was added to the Reds’ active roster. He pitched 1.1 shutout innings in 2020. After recording a 5.23 ERA in 14 appearances, Romano was again designated for assignment on May 14, 2021. On May 17, Romano cleared waivers and elected free agency.

New York Yankees
On May 19, 2021, Romano signed a minor league contract with the New York Yankees organization. Romano recorded a 3.63 ERA in 17 games with the Triple-A Scranton/Wilkes-Barre RailRiders before he was released on July 18. Romano re-signed with the Yankees organization on a new minor league contract the same day. The Yankees selected Romano’s contract to the major league roster on July 22. In two appearances for the Yankees, Romano pitched  scoreless innings with three strikeouts. On July 31, Romano was designated for assignment by the Yankees.

Milwaukee Brewers
Romano was claimed off waivers by the Milwaukee Brewers on August 3, 2021. In 1 inning pitched for the Brewers, Romano gave up 3 runs. On August 10, 2021, Romano was designated for assignment by the Brewers. On August 13, Romano elected free agency.

New York Yankees (second stint)
On August 14, 2021, Romano signed a minor league contract to return to the New York Yankees. He was assigned to Triple-A Scranton. The Yankees selected his contract on September 8, and he made 1 appearance, getting 2 outs while giving up 1 run. On September 10, 2021, The Yankees designated Romano for assignment. On September 13, Romano cleared waivers, but rejected his outright assignment, making him a free agent. The next day, Romano re-signed a major league contract with the Yankees. Romano once again only made 1 appearance for the Yankees, getting 1 out and giving up 1 run. After being injured and placed on the 10-day IL, the Yankees released Romano on September 20.

Seattle Mariners
On March 22, 2022, Romano signed a minor league contract with the Seattle Mariners. On April 4, Romano retired from professional baseball.

References

External links

Living people
1993 births
People from Syosset, New York
People from Southington, Connecticut
Baseball players from New York (state)
Baseball players from Connecticut
American people of Italian descent
Major League Baseball pitchers
Cincinnati Reds players
New York Yankees players
Milwaukee Brewers players
Billings Mustangs players
Dayton Dragons players
Daytona Tortugas players
Pensacola Blue Wahoos players
Louisville Bats players
Scranton/Wilkes-Barre RailRiders players